Tropaeolum peregrinum, the canary-creeper,  canarybird flower, canarybird vine, or canary nasturtium,  is a species of Tropaeolum native to western South America in Peru and possibly also Ecuador.

Description

It is a climbing plant growing to 2.5 m high by scrambling over other vegetation. The leaves are 2–5 cm diameter, palmately lobed with three to seven (mostly five) lobes; they are subpeltate, with the petiole attached within the leaf (not at the edge), though near the edge. The flowers are 2–4 cm diameter, with five frilled petals, bright pale yellow (canary-coloured, hence the English name), often with red spots at the base of the petals, eight stamens, and a 12 mm nectar spur at the rear.

Cultivation
It is a frost-tender perennial widely grown as an annual ornamental plant in cool temperate parts of the world.

References

peregrinum
Flora of Peru
Garden plants of South America
Plants described in 1753
Taxa named by Carl Linnaeus